Janani Bharadwaj is an Indian playback singer. She has sung in Tamil and Telugu Languages. She is the daughter of the music director Bharadwaj.

Career 

Janani debuted as a playback singer with the song Athiri Pathiri, from the film Ayya.

Discography 

Janani has sung in more than 15 films in Tamil.

References 

 Tottadaing - Janani's youthful voice
 Janani's Debut Song
 Janani Bharadwaj's Wedding
 Indiaglitz Music Review

Singers from Chennai
Tamil playback singers
Living people
1989 births
Telugu playback singers
Indian women playback singers
21st-century Indian women singers
21st-century Indian singers